In group theory, a group  is algebraically closed if any finite set of equations and inequations that are applicable to  have a solution in  without needing a group extension.

Informal discussion

Suppose we wished to find an element  of a group  satisfying the conditions (equations and inequations):

Then it is easy to see that this is impossible because the first two equations imply . (In fact this set of conditions are inconsistent with any group whatsoever.)

Now suppose  is the group with the multiplication table to the right.

Then the conditions:

However the conditions:

However if we extend the group  to the group  with the adjacent multiplication table:

Thus there are three possibilities regarding such conditions:

It is reasonable to ask whether there are any groups  such that whenever a set of conditions like these have a solution at all, they have a solution in  itself? The answer turns out to be "yes", and we call such groups algebraically closed groups.

Formal definition

We first need some preliminary ideas.

The set  represents equations like: 

The set  represents inequations like

In the example the substitutions  and  yield:

We say the finite set of equations and inequations is consistent with  if we can solve them in a "bigger" group . More formally:

Known Results

It is difficult to give concrete examples of algebraically closed groups as the following results indicate:

 Every countable group can be embedded in a countable algebraically closed group.
 Every algebraically closed group is simple.
 No algebraically closed group is finitely generated.
 An algebraically closed group cannot be recursively presented.
 A finitely generated group has a solvable word problem if and only if it can be embedded in every algebraically closed group.

The proofs of these results are in general very complex. However, a sketch of the proof that a countable group  can be embedded in an algebraically closed group follows.

Fix an enumeration  of them. Define groups  inductively by:

Now let:

Now iterate this construction to get a sequence of groups  and let:

Then  is a countable group containing .

See also 

 Algebraic closure
 Algebraically closed field

References

 A. Macintyre: On algebraically closed groups, ann. of Math, 96, 53-97 (1972)
 B.H. Neumann: A note on algebraically closed groups. J. London Math. Soc. 27, 227-242 (1952)
 B.H. Neumann: The isomorphism problem for algebraically closed groups. In: Word Problems, pp 553–562. Amsterdam: North-Holland 1973
 W.R. Scott: Algebraically closed groups. Proc. Amer. Math. Soc. 2, 118-121 (1951)

Properties of groups